"When He Walks on You (Like You Have Walked on Me)" is a single by American country music artist Jerry Lee Lewis. Released in June 1971, it was the second single from his album Touching Home. The song peaked at number 11 on the Billboard Hot Country Singles chart. It also reached number 1 on the RPM Country Tracks chart in Canada.

Chart performance

References

1971 singles
Jerry Lee Lewis songs
Songs written by Dallas Frazier
Songs written by A.L. "Doodle" Owens
1971 songs